Mwana Kupona binti Msham (born on Pate Island, died c. 1865) was a Swahili poet of the 19th century, author of a poem called Utendi wa Mwana Kupona ("The Book of Mwana Kupona"), which is one of the most well-known works of early Swahili literature. 

Relatively little is known about her life. Her grandson Muhammed bin Abdalla reported in the 1930s that Mwana Kupona was born on Pate Island, and that she was the last wife of sheikh Bwana Mataka, ruler of  Siu (or Siyu), with whom she had two children. Mataka died in 1856; two years later, Mwana Kupona wrote her famous poem, dedicated to her 14-year-old daughter Mwana Heshima. Mwana Kupona died around 1865 of uterine hemorrhaging.

Utendi wa Mwana Kupona
The poem dates to about 1858 (year 1275 of the Islamic calendar), and is centered on the teachings and advice of Mwana Kupona to her daughter, concerning marriage and wifely duties. Despite the seemingly secular subject, the book is prominently religious and even mystical, and it has been compared to the Biblical Book of Proverbs. A few lines of the poem are dedicated to the author herself:

References in culture
 The Kenyan writer and Swahili literature scholar Kitula King'ei published in 2000 a children's book entitled Mwana Kupona: Poetess from Lamu, based on the work and life of Mwana Kupona.

See also
 Swahili literature

Notes

References
 Kitula King'ei, "Aspects of Autobiography in the Classical Swahili Poetry: Problems of Identity of Authorship", Folklore, vol. 16, 2001.

Swahili-language writers
Kenyan women writers
1860s deaths
Year of death uncertain
Year of birth unknown
19th-century Kenyan women writers
19th-century Kenyan writers